Galbooly or Boly, or Galvoly is a civil parish in County Tipperary, Ireland. It is one of 21 civil parishes in the barony of Eliogarty. It has area of 1268 acres, divided into six townlands:
Galbooly
Galbooly Little
Shanacloon
Coolkennedy
Newbrook
Knockakilly

As a parish of the Church of Ireland, it was a vicarage in the Diocese of Cashel and part of the Union of Borrisleigh.

References

 Galbooly